Chattahoochee Technical College (Chattahoochee Tech, CTC, or Chatt Tech) is a public technical college in the U.S. state of Georgia. It is governed by the Technical College System of Georgia and has eight campuses in the north-northwest metro-Atlanta area, and another just outside the region.  It is accredited by the Southern Association of Colleges and Schools Commission on Colleges (SACS) to award technical certificates of credit, diplomas, and associate degrees. The college was formed in 2009 as the result of the merger of Appalachian Technical College, Chattahoochee Technical College, and North Metro Technical College.

Locations 

There are eight campus locations north and northwest of Atlanta.

North Metro Campus
North Metro Technical College was established in 1989 as one of the first institutions created under the direction of the new Department of Technical and Adult Education. Originally named North Metro Technical Institute, the college was in Acworth, GA, and officially served Bartow and north Cobb counties, but was also positioned to serve the populations in Cherokee and Paulding counties. The campus was named the North Metro Campus following the 2009 merger.

Marietta Campus
The original and main campus, the Marietta Campus, is immediately adjacent to Marietta, between South Cobb Drive (Georgia 280) and Sandtown Road. During the early 2000s, three buildings were added on the other side of Sandtown Road, within the Marietta city limits.

Mountain View Campus
The Mountain View Campus is in northeast Cobb County; it is one of the college's three original campuses. The campus was donated to Cobb County by the family of the late Frank Gordy, proprietor of The Varsity restaurant in Atlanta.  Specified for educational use, the county supplied the land and most of the construction money for the building, which was dedicated to the county commission in 2000 and opened for class that October, and was transferred to the state in 2009 after having been leased for a dollar a year.  It shares a parking lot with the adjacent Mountain View Aquatics Center, an indoor public swimming pool run by the county.  The school's address is on Frank Gordy Parkway, a loop which allows access to these developments, but whose street name signs all indicate only Gordy Parkway. The Mountain View Campus is home to the college's Design and Media Production Technology program, and the Film and Video Production Technology program.

Austell Campus
The South Cobb Campus is now known as the Austell Campus, (Mableton/Austell); it is one of the college's three original campuses. The South Cobb Campus was renamed the Austell Campus in spring 2010.  It consists of two one-story buildings on Tech Center Drive, and its address is on Veterans Memorial Drive (U.S. 78/278 & Georgia 8), which was originally the historic Bankhead Highway.

Paulding Campus
The Paulding Campus (Dallas) is another of the college's three original campuses. It was dedicated in November 1996. A second building was constructed in 2009, and dedicated on October 13, with keynote speaker Glenn Richardson. The Paulding Campus is home to the college's nursing program.

Appalachian Campus
Gilmer (north of Pickens) is the only county within the school's official service area that does not have a campus of its own, but is served by the Appalachian Campus in Jasper, Pickens County.

Canton Campus
The Canton Campus opened at Bluffs Technology Park (approximately ) for winter quarter 2011.

Woodstock Campus
The Woodstock Campus is in the former Woodstock Elementary School (historically the all-grades Woodstock School, the town's first public school), and was the second campus of Appalachian Tech.

References

External links 
 Official website
 New Georgia Encyclopedia on CTC

Technical College System of Georgia
Education in Cobb County, Georgia
Education in Paulding County, Georgia
Education in Cherokee County, Georgia
Education in Pickens County, Georgia
Educational institutions established in 1961
Universities and colleges accredited by the Southern Association of Colleges and Schools
Buildings and structures in Cobb County, Georgia
Buildings and structures in Paulding County, Georgia
Buildings and structures in Cherokee County, Georgia
Buildings and structures in Pickens County, Georgia
Marietta, Georgia
1961 establishments in Georgia (U.S. state)
NJCAA athletics